The Ducal Palace of Gandia was, from the 14th century, the residence of the Royal Dukes of Gandía, and from 1485, the Borja family. It was the birthplace of Saint Francis Borja.

The oldest part of the building dates from the 15th century in Valencian Gothic style, but was restored and turned into a sanctuary by the Society of Jesus. It is attached to the wall that surrounds the city and has two gates, a Gothic one and one from the Renaissance.

Its remarkable interior has some interesting spaces, like the Golden Gallery, made in Baroque style, and the Crown Hall.

Initially the Palace was designed as a civil Gothic style urban castle and was ultimately transformed into a comfortable fortified palace. The main entrance to the Palacio Ducal is a robust door with a rounded arch, which together with the hallways are the oldest elements of the Gothic palace. You enter from this area and there is an imposing central parade ground with an impressive exterior staircase by which you ascend to the halls, among which the Baroque style Salón de Coronas and Galeria Dorada are notable.

See also 

 House of Borgia
 Duke of Gandia
 List of Jesuit sites
 Monastery of Sant Jeroni de Cotalba
 Route of the Borgias
 Route of the Valencian classics

Bibliography 
Soler Salcedo, Juan Miguel (2008). Nobleza Española: grandeza inmemorial 1520. Visión Libros .

External links 

 Website of the Ducal Palace of Gandia 

Route of the Borgias
Bien de Interés Cultural landmarks in the Province of Valencia
Palaces in the Valencian Community
Azulejos in buildings in the Valencian Community
Gandia